Mufti Abdullah (1931 – May 31, 2013) was a Pakistani, politician. He was the Gilgit-Baltistan MLA for Khaplu.

References

2013 deaths
Pakistani politicians